Star Trek: Invasion is a video game, released in 2000 for the Sony PlayStation console. The game was developed by Warthog Games for Activision. The game also has some distinction being developed by the same team (who were mostly working under Warthog Games) responsible for the Colony Wars series.

A "space combat shooter" title, Star Trek: Invasion is based on characters and situations from Star Trek: The Next Generation. The game features voice acting performances by several Star Trek actors, including Patrick Stewart (Jean-Luc Picard) and Michael Dorn (Worf).

Development
Invasion was the first Star Trek game to be released for the Sony PlayStation. It was developed by Activision in conjunction with Warthog Games, who had previously created the Colony Wars series of games.

Reception

The game received "generally favorable reviews" according to the review aggregation website Metacritic. Starlog praised the game, saying that it "delivers big and entertains" and said that the graphics were "great", but criticised the Star Trek experience saying that the music lacks the feeling of the franchise and the ships seen in the game don't match those which appeared on television or in the films. It added that players should be "pleased with the game" if they could sidestep the lack of a typical Gene Roddenberry/Star Trek feeling. John Gaudiosi of NextGen said of the game, "A textbook example of how to blend a popular license with solid console gameplay, this deep-space shooter offers an original Star Trek storyline and fun multiplayer action."

In 2016, Tom's Guide ranked it as one of the top ten Star Trek games,

Notes

References

External links

2000 video games
Activision games
Cancelled Game Boy Advance games
PlayStation (console) games
PlayStation (console)-only games
Space combat simulators
Invasion
Video games developed in the United Kingdom
Star Trek video games using television cast members
Multiplayer and single-player video games